The siege of Fort St. Philip was a ten day long distance bombardment of exploding bomb shells - by two Royal Navy bomb vessels, mounting a total of four mortars - against the American garrison of Fort St. Philip. The fort was unable to retaliate at the start, as the bomb vessels were out or the range of its solid shot cannon, and its mortar did not have ammunition. This was remedied by supply boats, whereby the fort counter-attacked the bomb vessels with its mortar on January 17, and the British duly withdrew. This riverine engagement took place during the concluding hostilities of the War of 1812.

Background
In August 1814, Vice Admiral Cochrane had finally convinced the Admiralty that a campaign against New Orleans would weaken American resolve against Canada, and hasten a successful end to the war. The Royal Navy had begun the Louisiana Campaign to capture New Orleans. The shallow coastal waters around New Orleans were protected by gunboats. The approach to New Orleans via the Mississippi was defended by Fort St Philip.

The existing structure had been constructed in 1795 by the Spanish. Fort St. Philip was described as 'an irregular work, the body a parallelogram. Approaches to it are nearly impracticable.' (Today, the fort is only accessible via boat or helicopter.) The fort mounted twenty-nine 24-pound cannons, a 6-pound cannon, two howitzers (of 5.5-inch and 8 inch calibres) and a 13-inch mortar. Additionally, two 32-pound cannons were mounted on a level with the water, in a covert way. Thirty-five pieces in all were used.  A US Navy gunboat lay offshore.

In October 1814 the gunners repaired the worn-out U.S. artillery carriages and moved some to other batteries in the fort. The Americans built a signal station three miles below the installation and an earthen redoubt to defend the fort's rear side. In addition to mounting a battery for a mortar in the fort, it was suggested to construct a battery on the opposite side of the Mississippi, which would support the aforementioned two 32-pound cannons; the defence of both sides of that passage of the river being complete.

Whilst overseeing the defences in December, General Jackson ordered the construction of a battery on the other side of the river, besides increasing the strength of the fort with a mortar battery. The riverside battery was not finished though by the time the British flotilla arrived and was abandoned during the engagement. Major Latour of the US Corps of Engineers was involved with the improvement of the fort's defences, but was not here during this engagement, being resident at New Orleans, and participating in the fighting there.

They also erected overhead cover above the fort's gun batteries to prevent shell fragments from hitting the gun-crews. They destroyed the old powder magazine, replacing it with several additional magazines that they built, which had wood and dirt piled on top to protect them. The idea being that if one powder magazine was destroyed, the others would still be usable.

At the request of Jackson, at the start of December a picket was placed on duty at Fort de la Balize at the mouth of the Mississippi, who were captured by a boarding party landed by HMS Herald. Around December 15, Major Walter H. Overton was appointed as the commander of Fort St Philip. The fort was reinforced with a further company of the 7th Infantry, and by 30 volunteer free men of color militiamen. The American garrison were primarily infantry - of whom 84 militia, 163 were regulars - supported by 117 artillery men to man the fort's cannon and mortar.

On January 1, 1815, Major Overton was warned of an approaching British flotilla. On the morning of January 8, a look out boat arrived, to warn of the imminent approach of the flotilla. 

The British vessels were ordered on December 30 to proceed up the Mississippi. From January 5 through January 7, the vessels crossed the shallow channel at the bar at the mouth of the Mississippi, the Herald having grounded on the bar on January 7. It took the British vessels to January 9 to work the forty miles up the Mississippi to the fort, by warping and hard towing to the Plaquemines Bend, just below the fort.

The Rating system of the Royal Navy covered all vessels with 20 guns and above; thus, these are classified as 'unrated' vessels. They had been ordered to sail up the Mississippi, and to create a diversion, with the bombardment of the fort by launching exploding bomb shells from the bomb vessels' mortars. These boats had originally been accompanied by the fifth rate , but it was too large to traverse the shallow waters of the bar at the mouth of the Mississippi. The brig and the schooner have been mis-labelled as HMS Sophia and HMS Tender in Lossing's book. This is yet another case of mistaken identity on his maps, which is unquestioned and reproduced by Remini.

Siege
The five British boat types were visible, and clearly identified, at 10:15am. At 11:30am and 12:30pm, two bumboats advanced to a distance within a mile and a half of the fort, to take soundings of the river bottom. This prompted the fort's shore battery to open fire with their 32-pounders. Although they drove the bumboats back, eventually arriving back at the flotilla at 3:00pm, the garrison had revealed the maximum range of their solid shot cannons. At midday, in preparation for engaging the vessels, the fort's furnace was lit for heated shot. At 1:00 pm, the signal station was abandoned by the American soldiers. At 2:00pm on January 9, a British landing party occupied the signal station.

That morning, the flotilla had moored south of the fort, a distance of two and a quarter miles, or 3,960 yards. Early that afternoon, the two bomb vessels advanced slightly to take up positions 3,700 yards south of the fort. At 3:30pm, the bombardment of the fort commenced. Latour states that the bombardment continued day and night, this is not corroborated by Overton's account. HMS Volcano's log records that it fired fifty mortar shells that day, which calls into question the statements made by Latour.  One shell fell every two minutes according to Latour, but this is not corroborated by Overton's account. During the first day of the bombardment, no American soldiers became casualties.

Latour's narration of the events continues. Due to the wet terrain from rain during most of the bombardment, mortar shells slammed into the ground, buried themselves in the wet marshy soil, and failed to explode. Some shells exploded underground, merely creating a tremor, and purportedly causing no material damage. Latour subsequently contradicts his own statement in his damage assessment and this is not corroborated by Overton. Latour claims that night, several rowboats approached the fort. Although he was not present, he claims they 'came so close as to allow us almost distinctly to hear their crews conversing', firing several rounds of grape and round shot into the fort. Latour theorises this was to divert attention from the flotilla, which could have used the distraction to pass the fort unmolested. The supposed British feint failed to distract the American soldiers, so the rowboats withdrew for the night but the British bomb vessels continued to bombard the fort at long range.

The next day, Latour states that 'the bombardment was continued with the same vivacity as on the former day', except the shelling ceased for two hour periods at midday and at sundown. This is not corroborated by Overton's account. HMS Volcano's log records that it fired eighty mortar shells that day, which calls into question the statements made by Latour.

There was occasional retaliatory cannon fire from the fort's batteries on the 9th and the 10th but the shot fell short. A similar barrage directed towards the two bomb vessels was made from the fort on the 11th at 4:00pm for fifteen minutes, with no effect other than possibly disturbing their fire.

Later in the day on the 11th, shrapnel struck the American flag post, nailing the halyards to the mast. The flag was repaired and replaced on the flag pole, an hour after lowering, by an American sailor who braved the British bombardment by climbing up the mast and securing the flag while shots burst overhead. The sailor completed this without injury. The evening of January 11, the bomb vessels bombarded the fort's store house, thinking it to be the powder magazine. Several shells passed straight through the store house; two exploded within it, killing one man and wounding another. The real powder magazines escaped harm with the exception of the main magazine which suffered some minor damage but failed to explode. HMS Volcano's log records that it fired ninety two mortar shells that day. The noise of the bombardment could be heard that night at the Villère Plantation, as recorded in Colonel Dickson's journal.

On the morning of the 12th four rowboats returned from having reconnoitred the fort, firing howitzer shells and round shot into the fort prior to returning to the flotilla. It would appear this was misplaced by Latour as taking place on the morning of the 10th. Overton's account does not specify when this took place. 

Latour states that a similar barrage, with the usual intervals, was directed upon the fort by the bomb vessels on the 12 January through to 14 January. On January 12, HMS Volcano fired 56 mortar shells until a shell burst in the mortar. Nobody was hurt, and the damage to the vessel was repaired overnight, to allow a bombardment to continue the next day. 

Realizing that their weapons were not very effective during the first few days of bombardment, on January 14, Latour theorized the British re-fused all of their shells to explode over the fort (Air burst), in order to shower the garrison with shrapnel. Consequentially the American soldiers sustained another death and a few more wounded. The shells also damaged several of the fort's gun carriages. HMS Volcano's log makes no mention of re-fuzing their mortar shells. That day, the Volcano fired thirty shells and three carcasses. These British munitions managed to silence one of the two American 32-pounders, but only for an hour before repairs were completed. On this night, still the 14th, several British munitions struck the blacksmith's shop, damaging it severely.

By the night of January 15, the United States garrison had constructed in the prior 24 hours more adequate defenses around their batteries from stockpiles of wood which were being brought into the fort from the nearby forest. The powder magazines were also reinforced by another layer of dirt. Rain had fallen, with little intermission, since the start of the engagement against the British and had left the interior of the fort underwater, making it similar to a livestock pond. All of the garrison's tents were ripped up from shell fragments though they were unoccupied. That evening, several supply boats arrived at the fort, having set out 65 miles upriver from New Orleans, carrying ammunition and most importantly fuses for the fort's inoperative mortar. This helped morale of the American garrison, who were now in a better form for defense than when the engagement began.

On the morning of the 17th, Latour claims a less intense bombardment of the fort was commenced by the British at 10:00am. In the evening, the fort's mortar was ready, and it started a counter bombardment against the British bomb vessels. At some point one of the British bomb vessels was struck by an American mortar shell which put the boat out of action for five minutes. In response, a more intense bombardment was continued into the night.

The mortar duel continued during the night of the January 17 and just before daylight on the 18th; several shells were lodged in Fort St. Philip's parapet; one burst passing through a ditch and into the center bastion. These were the last shots the fort received. At 6:00am the vessels headed south down the river. On the afternoon of January 22, the vessels had crossed the bar and had exited the Mississippi.

Aftermath

In a despatch sent to the Secretary of War, dated January 19, Jackson states 'I am strengthened not only by [the defeat of the British at New Orleans]... but by the failure of his fleet to pass fort St. Philip.' Remini believes this was preventing the British moving their fleet up the Mississippi in support of the land attack. Roosevelt, as a naval historian, does not share Remini's theory. He observes that the British disengaged once the fort's mortar was resupplied and was able to return fire on January 17, the engagement being described as 'unsuccessfully bombarding' the fort by the British. The engagement is briefly mentioned in Roosevelt's naval history of the conflict and is dismissively summarized by one sentence.

The physical impossibility of Cochrane's fleet being able to overcome the bar at the mouth of the Mississippi does rule out the notion that the fleet could have sailed up the river. Most of these ships were in excess of 1,000 burthen tonnes, Cochrane's flagship  being 2,281 tonnes, whereas the heaviest boat to have taken part in the engagement against the fort was 430 tonnes, being HMS Herald. For similar reasons, the Union attack on the fort in 1862 was made by schooner- and raft-mounted mortars that could negotiate the bar without beaching. The lack of any tangible sized amphibious landing does not support the idea the British wanted to capture the fort. The British were happy enough to be a 'diversion' by being moored out of the range of the fort's cannons, and by shelling the fort from a distance with mortars. Whilst the engagement appeared to have served no directly useful purpose to the British, it could be said it made a valuable contribution to the escape of Lambert's army elsewhere, to deter Jackson's forces from redeploying because of hostile forces at the fort, whose size and intention were unknown.  
 
Overton claims that well over 1,000 British mortar shells were fired, estimated by Latour to be seventy tons of munitions. It has not been possible to corroborate that claim with daily expenditure from British sources, but the commanding officer of the Volcano has echoed Overton's comment. After the siege ended, the Americans discovered that over 100 enemy shells lay buried within the fort, unexploded. Nearly all of the buildings were in ruins and the ground for a half mile around the fort was littered with bomb craters.

Two American soldiers were killed and seven were wounded while sustaining severe damage to their fort. Neither the name of the commander, nor if the British had suffered casualties were recorded in contemporary sources, as the engagement was not considered significant enough for coverage. British historians have shown little interest in this engagement, with the exception of one pair of regimental historians in the 1920s.

In addition to Jackson's despatch of January 19 mentioning the engagement, the part played by Acting Lieutenant (navy) Cunningham was mentioned in the despatch of Master Commandant Daniel Patterson to the Secretary of the Navy dated January 27. Three currently active Regular Army battalions (1-5 FA, 1-1 Inf and 2-1 Inf) perpetuate the lineages of two American units (Wollstonecraft's Company, Corps of Artillery, and the old 7th Infantry) that were present at Fort St. Philip during the bombardment.

The incomplete battery opposite the fort was replaced with a larger structure, Fort Jackson. This and Fort St Philip were besieged in the American Civil War.

See also

Jean Lafitte
Capture of USS President
Battle of Forts Jackson and St. Philip

Notes and citations
Notes

Citations

References

External links
 Siege of Fort St. Philip — eyewitness account by Overton, and excerpts from Latour's book, as republished in the Louisiana Historical Quarterly

 a b c d "Fort St. Philip". National Historic Landmark summary listing. National Park Service. https://web.archive.org/web/20110308014818/http://tps.cr.nps.gov/nhl/detail.cfm?ResourceId=261&ResourceType=Structure. Retrieved 2008-02-01.
 Sutton, James (2007-09-10). "Ft. St. Philip – Vella-Ashby". Panoramio. https://www.panoramio.com/photo/4502551. Retrieved 2008-11-08.

Fort St. Philip
Fort St. Philip
Fort St. Philip
History of Louisiana
Fort St. Philip (1815)
Fort St. Philip (1815)
Fort St. Philip (1815)
1815 in Louisiana
January 1815 events
Fort St. Philip